The La Combattante IIIA type missile boats of the Hellenic Navy are a class of four fast attack craft ordered by Greece in September 1974 from France. The vessels had no class name but are referred to by type. They are similar to the La Combattante IIa-class fast attack craft already in service, but are larger and armed with torpedoes. A second group of six were ordered in 1978, to be built under license in Greece and use Penguin Mk 2 Mod 3 missiles. Since 2019, all the ships of the class use Harpoon anti-ship missiles.

Ships

La Combattante IIIA 
The ships of this class have been named after officers of the Hellenic Navy killed during World War II. They are:

Greek ships

Qatari ships

La Combattante IIIb
The La Combattante IIIb type missile boats of the Hellenic Navy are a class of six fast attack craft built in Greece to a French design. The vessels had no class name but are referred to by type.
They are a similar but newer design than the Greek La Combattante III-class fast attack craft, with the main difference that they use Kongsberg Penguin Mk 2 Mod 3 missiles. The six ships were built at Hellenic Shipyards (first launching in 1979). Kostakos (P 25) sank after collision with a ferry in November 1996.

The ships of this class have been named after junior officers of the Hellenic Navy killed during World War II. They are:

Mid-life modernization
In 2003 the Hellenic Navy decided to modernize the Fast Attack Craft Missile Class La Combattante III and La Combattante IIIb. For the four Combattante III fast attack craft, Thales Nederland delivered the TACTICOS combat management system which includes four multifunctional operator consoles, one surveillance radar, one fire control tracking system, one electro-optical tracking and fire control system, an integrated low probability of interception radar, two target designation sights and a tactical data link. The weapon suite of the Combattantes III remained unchanged. Thales was responsible for the integration of these existing guns, surface-to-surface missiles and torpedo system. The modernization project was completed in 2010.
After the completion of the modernization program, Hellenic Navy substituted all the existing anti-ship missiles (Penguin Mk2 Mod 3 and Exocet) with Harpoon missiles (coming from stock from previously decommissioned ships).

Gallery

Notes

References
  Gardiner, Robert; Chumbley, Stephen  Conway's All The World's Fighting Ships 1947–1995 (1995) Naval Institute Press, Annapolis 
https://web.archive.org/web/20060906041332/http://www.hellenicnavy.gr/facm_la_combattanteIII_en.asp
http://www.ellinikos-stratos.com/naytiko/combattanteIIIa.asp

Bibliography
  Gardiner, Robert; Chumbley, Stephen  Conway's All The World's Fighting Ships 1947–1995 (1995) Naval Institute Press, Annapolis 

Missile boats of the Hellenic Navy
Missile boat classes